Alexander Reichel (born March 3, 1971) is a former professional tennis player from the United States.

Career
Reichel, who was coached by Phil Dent, made the quarterfinals at the 1993 South African Open, in Durban. En route he defeated Mark Woodforde, then ranked 21 in the world, as well as Filip Dewulf. He competed in the main draw of the 1997 Australian Open and was beaten by Austrian Gilbert Schaller in the first round. Reichel sustained several serious injuries, including one on his wrist, which made continuing his career tough, ultimately causing him to retire from professional tennis.

References

External links
 
 

1971 births
Living people
American male tennis players
Tennis players from Los Angeles